Inositol 1,4,5-trisphosphate receptor type 1 is a protein that in humans is encoded by the ITPR1 gene.

Interactions 

ITPR1 has been shown to interact with:

 AHCYL1, 
 CA8, 
 EPB41L1 
 FKBP1A, 
 MRVI1, 
 PRKG1, 
 RHOA,  and
 TRPC4.

See also 
 Inositol triphosphate
 Inositol triphosphate receptor

References

Further reading

External links 
 
  GeneReviews/NCBI/NIH/UW entry on Spinocerebellar Ataxia Type 15

Ion channels